After Death (Pósle smérti, "After death") is a 1915 Russian film directed by Yevgeni Bauer.

Plot 
The film is based on the novella Klara Milich (1883) by Ivan Turgenev.

"Reclusive young man Andrei is reluctantly persuaded out to social events by his friend Tsenin, and encounters the beautiful actress Zoia. The two meet briefly but then he does not see her for months. He is then shocked to learn that she has collapsed and died, and he becomes morbidly and madly obsessed with her."

Starring 

 Vitold Polonsky – Andrei Bagrov
 Olga Rakhmanova – Kapitolana Markovna, Andrei's aunt
 Vera Karalli – Zoia Kadmina
 Mariya Khalatova – Zoia's mother (as M. Khalatova)
 Tamara Gedevanova – Zoia's sister
 Marfa Kassatskaia – Princess Tarskaia 
 Georg Asagaroff – Tsenin, Andrei's friend

References

Further reading 
Armstrong, Richard, Mourning Films: A Critical Study of Loss and Grieving in Cinema, Jefferson: McFarland 2012.
Boele, Otto.  "After Death, the Movie (1915) – Ivan Turgenev, Evgenii Bauer and the Aesthetics of Morbidity". Rodopi: 2010. https://openaccess.leidenuniv.nl/handle/1887/16319
Drubek, Natascha. Russisches Licht. Von der Ikone zum frühen sowjetischen Kino, Wien – Köln – Weimar: Böhlau 2012.
Drubek-Meyer, Natascha "Der Film als Leben nach dem Tode (Evgenij Bauėrs Posle smerti, 1915)". Wiener Slawistischer Almanach 60, 2007, pp. 457–273.

External links 

 https://www.youtube.com/watch?v=PomQyFUMJBc – with the score by Michael Brown (performed by Triptych).
 https://reflect.ucl.ac.uk/2019-sers0014-russiancinemahistoryideologysociety/2019/04/11/example-3/
 https://silentsplease.wordpress.com/2014/07/12/after-death/

1915 films
1910s ghost films
1910s Russian-language films
Russian black-and-white films
Russian silent films
Films of the Russian Empire